Viktor Vladimirovich Vinogradov (– 4 October 1969) was a Soviet linguist and philologist who presided over Soviet linguistics after World War II.

Life and career
Vinogradov was born at Zaraysk in 1895. His teachers at the Petrograd Institute of History and Philology included Lev Shcherba and Aleksey Shakhmatov, but Charles Bally's ideas influenced him the most deeply during his formative years. He made his mark as a scholar of Russian literature with a series of works examining the style and language of Russian classical writers, including Alexander Pushkin (1935, 1941), Nikolai Gogol (1936), Mikhail Lermontov (1941), and Anna Akhmatova (a family friend, 1925). In 1926 he married Nadezhda Malysheva (Надежда Матвеевна Виноградова-Малышева, 1897–1990), a singing teacher.

From the standpoint of linguistics, Vinogradov set out as a good-natured critic of the Russian formalists: he was on friendly terms with many of them. After moving from Leningrad to Moscow in 1929 he became implicated in the "Slavists conspiracy" and the authorities exiled him to Vyatka in 1934. Two years later, he was allowed to settle somewhat closer to the capital, in Mozhaysk, only to be exiled to Siberia after Hitler's invasion of Russia in 1941. His father, an Orthodox priest, was purged in 1930.

After Joseph Stalin became alarmed with the (mis)management of Soviet linguistics by Nikolai Marr and his followers, Vinogradov found himself appointed Director of the Linguistics Institute (1950). The authorities heaped honors on him in profusion: he was elected into the Academy of Sciences of the Soviet Union and was awarded the Stalin Prize (1951). This sudden reversal of fortune made him willing to gratify the authorities, as was demonstrated by his participation in the notorious Sinyavsky–Daniel trial (1965-1966). Vinogradov's rise to power cemented his followers (Sergey Ozhegov, Natalia Shvedova) into the dominant academic school of Soviet linguistics. The Russian Language Institute, which he administered from 1958, still bears his name.

He died in Moscow in 1969.

References

Sources 
 This article is based on a translation of the equivalent article of the Russian Wikipedia on 6 July 2008.

1895 births
1969 deaths
People from Zaraysky District
People from Zaraysky Uyezd
Members of the Supreme Soviet of the Russian Soviet Federative Socialist Republic, 1951–1955
Members of the Supreme Soviet of the Russian Soviet Federative Socialist Republic, 1955–1959
Linguists from Russia
Linguists from the Soviet Union
Fyodor Dostoyevsky scholars
Literary theorists
Morphologists
Semanticists
Russian philologists
Russian studies scholars
Soviet philologists
20th-century linguists
20th-century philologists
Academic staff of Saint Petersburg State University
Full Members of the USSR Academy of Sciences
Corresponding members of the Académie des Inscriptions et Belles-Lettres
Corresponding members of the Romanian Academy
Foreign Members of the Bulgarian Academy of Sciences
Members of the German Academy of Sciences at Berlin
Foreign members of the Serbian Academy of Sciences and Arts
Members of the Royal Danish Academy of Sciences and Letters
Stalin Prize winners
Recipients of the Order of Lenin
Recipients of the Order of the Red Banner of Labour
Soviet rehabilitations
Burials at Novodevichy Cemetery